The 1936 United States Senate election in Alabama was held on November 2, 1936. 

Senator John H. Bankhead II was re-elected to a second term in office over Republican H. E. Berkstresser.

Democratic primary

Candidates
 H.L. Anderton, candidate for Senate in 1932
 John H. Bankhead II, incumbent Senator

Results

General election

Results

See also 
 1936 United States Senate elections

References 

1936
Alabama
United States Senate